Vooremaa ("Drumlin Land" in Estonian; also Saadjärv Drumlin Field) is a  landscape region mostly in Jõgeva County, Estonia. It consists of drumlins and depressions that were formed by glacial accumulation and erosion. All the landscape elements such as relief, vegetation, waterbodies and watercourses as well as settlements follow the northwest-southeast direction of the drumlins. One fifth (20.3%) of the area is covered by wetlands.

References

Landforms of Estonia
Landforms of Jõgeva County
Glacial landforms